John Turek (born February 19, 1983) is an American retired professional basketball player. Standing at 6 ft 9 in (2.06 m), Turek used to play as power forward or center. He played collegiately for the Nebraska Cornhuskers and continued his career as a professional player in Europe. Turek played for teams based in the Netherlands, Belgium, Poland, Germany and France.

Personal life
His brother, Joshua Turek, is a wheelchair basketball player, and Paralympic gold medalist.

Honours

Club
GasTerra Flames
NBB Cup (1): 2010–11

Individual
BBL blocks leader (1): 2009–10
DBL All-Star (1): 2006

References

External links
Profile at draftexpress.com
Profile at euroleague.net
Profile at eurobasket.com

1983 births
Living people
American expatriate basketball people in Belgium
American expatriate basketball people in France
American expatriate basketball people in Germany
American expatriate basketball people in Poland
American expatriate basketball people in the Netherlands
Basketball players from Iowa
Centers (basketball)
Donar (basketball club) players
Dutch Basketball League players
Nebraska Cornhuskers men's basketball players
Phoenix Hagen players
Power forwards (basketball)
Champagne Châlons-Reims Basket players
Rosa Radom players
Riesen Ludwigsburg players
Turów Zgorzelec players
Gent Hawks players
Almere Pioneers players
American men's basketball players